Buchegg is a municipality in the district of Bucheggberg, in the canton of Solothurn, Switzerland.  On 1 January 2014 the former municipalities of Tscheppach, Brügglen, Aetingen, Aetigkofen, Bibern (SO), Gossliwil, Hessigkofen, Mühledorf (SO), Küttigkofen and Kyburg-Buchegg merged into the municipality of Buchegg.

History
Aetigkofen is first mentioned in 1034 as Etikhouen.  Aetingen is first mentioned in 1267 as Etinge.  Bibern is first mentioned in 1366 as ze Bibron.  Brügglen is first mentioned in 1249 as Bruglon.  Gossliwil is first mentioned in 1246 as Gosseriswile.  In 1276 it was mentioned as Goselwyl.  Hessigkofen is first mentioned in 1034 as Esikouen.  Küttigkofen is first mentioned in 1316 as obrenchúttenkouen.  Kyburg-Buchegg is first mentioned in 1175 as Ernaldus de Boucecca.  Mühledorf is first mentioned around 1264 as Mulidorf though this is from a copy from 1415-20.  In 1276 it was mentioned as Mvlidorf.  Tscheppach is first mentioned in 1334 as Scheppach.

Geography

Demographics

Historic population
The historical population is given in the following chart:

Sights
The villages of Aetingen, Gossliwil, Hessigkofen, Mühledorf and Tscheppach are part of the Inventory of Swiss Heritage Sites.

Weather
Hessigkofen has an average of 130.6 days of rain or snow per year and on average receives  of precipitation. During this month there is precipitation for an average of 11.2 days. The month with the most days of precipitation is May, with an average of 12.8, but with only  of rain or snow.

References

Municipalities of the canton of Solothurn